Baladiyah al-Urayja, also Al Urayja Sub-Municipality is a baladiyah and one of 14 sub-municipalities of Riyadh, Saudi Arabia. It includes 13 neighborhoods and districts and is responsible for their planning, development and maintenance.

Neighborhoods and districts 

 Derihmiyah
 Shubra
 Suwaydi al-Gharbi
 Al Urayja
 Al Urayja al-Gharbiyah (partially)
 Al Urayja al-Wusta
 Al-Zahrah
 Al-Zahrah al-Badiah
 Al-Suwaidi
 Al-Sultanah
 Tuwaiq
 Hajrah Laban (partially)

References

Baladiyahs of Riyadh
Economy of Riyadh